Kim Jung-hwa (born September 9, 1983)is a South Korean actress. She rose to fame in the 2002 sitcom Nonstop 3, and has since played leading roles in the television series Something About 1% (2003) and Snow White: Taste Sweet Love (2004), as well as the films Spy Girl (2004) and The Elephant on the Bike (2007).

Career
Kim Jung-hwa made her acting debut in 2000 when she appeared in Lee Seung-hwan's music video "You to You." She rose to fame in 2002 with the sitcom Nonstop 3, and was soon cast in supporting roles in the television dramas Glass Slippers (2002) and Into the Sun (2003).

Kim starred as the leading actress in the romantic comedies Something About 1% (2003) in which she played a middle school teacher who enters a contract marriage with a tycoon's grandson, and Snow White: Taste Sweet Love (2004) where her homely character is unexpectedly caught in a love triangle between two brothers. This was followed by her first film Spy Girl (2004), a comedy about a North Korean agent who goes undercover in the South as a Burger King employee, but to her dismay finds herself becoming popular with the male student customers.

Kim made her stage debut in 2006, in the Russian plays Uncle Vanya by Anton Chekhov and The Lower Depths by Maxim Gorky. She later starred in the homegrown musical Audition (2007), Sam Shepard's Fool for Love (2010), and the Kim Kwang-seok jukebox musical The Days (2013).

Her next major film role was in 2007's The Elephant on the Bike, as the love interest of an emotionally withdrawn zookeeper with a deformed hand. She then drew positive reviews for her portrayal of a cold-hearted loan shark heiress in the hit drama War of Money. Kim continued to appear in television, notably in four-episode anthology Things We Do That We Know We Will Regret (2008), and historical dramas The Kingdom of the Winds (2009) and Gwanggaeto, The Great Conqueror (2011). In 2012, Kim starred in Solid but Fluid (titled "Silverscreen Lovers" in Korean), a 3D short film about a soon-to-be-married couple that catches a glimpse of their future while at the drive-in theater.

Kim published a book of essays in 2012, which included her musings on life as an actress, as well as stories about her volunteer work helping impoverished children as part of the fight against global hunger. She titled it Hello, Agnes!, after the African child with HIV/AIDS whom she met in Uganda and has sponsored since 2009. Kim donated all proceeds to charity.

After a supporting role in Dating Agency: Cyrano (2013), Kim returned to cable television in 2015 in the disaster/medical drama D-Day.

Personal life
Kim married contemporary Christian music composer and missionary Yoo Eun-sung on August 24, 2013. They first met when both became goodwill ambassadors for the humanitarian organization Food for the Hungry International, and grew close when Yoo composed the music while Kim wrote the lyrics for the single "Hello, Agnes!" which accompanied the release of Kim's same-titled memoir.

She gave birth to their first child, son Yoo Hwa on June 14, 2014 in Atlanta, Georgia.

Filmography

Television series

Films

Music videos

Variety/radio shows

Theater

Discography

Book

Awards and nominations

References

External links
 
 
 
 
 

1983 births
Living people
South Korean television actresses
South Korean film actresses
South Korean musical theatre actresses
South Korean stage actresses
21st-century South Korean actresses
South Korean female models
Urok Kim clan